A non-belligerent is a person, a state, or other organization that does not fight in a given conflict. The term is often used to describe a country that does not take part militarily in a war.

A non-belligerent state differs from a neutral one in that it may support certain belligerents in a war but is not directly involved in military operations.
The term may also be used to describe a person not involved in combat or aggression, especially if combat or aggression is likely. In a situation of civil unrest such as a riot, civilians may be divided into belligerents, those actually fighting or intending to fight, and non-belligerents who are merely bystanders.

Examples

Spain
During World War II, Spain allowed and promoted the Spanish Blue Division of volunteers and conscripts to join the German forces on the condition that they would fight against the Soviet Union only and they would do it with German equipment and uniforms. At the same time, allied aircraft made emergency landings in Spanish territories (Melilla, Mallorca) and the Spanish government returned the crews home safely. The aircraft were either scrapped due to poor condition or repaired and allocated in the Spanish Air Force if not reclaimed, or after a negotiated purchase.

United States
A notable example of a non-belligerent in an environment of total war was the United States' military support of the Allies in World War II, prior to their entry into the war following the Japanese attack on Pearl Harbor. The military support given by the Americans was through the Destroyers-for-bases deal in which the United States provide the United Kingdom "all possible assistance short of war" in the words of Winston Churchill.

Italy
From September 1939 to June 1940, when it joined the war with Germany, Italy was a non-belligerent.

Ireland
Although officially Ireland declared itself neutral in World War II, it can be disputed whether it was a non-belligerent or not, as The Cranborne Report drew up by the Viscount Cranborne to the British War Cabinet noted regarding Irish-British collaboration. An example of such collaboration was the permission for Allied use of Irish airspace for military means.

Sweden
While Sweden did not officially fight in the Winter War, a new Flying regiment was formed out of volunteers to aid Finland and took charge of defending Finnish Lapland; the aircraft for the regiment came directly from Swedish Air Force inventory.

Japan 
The Article 9 of the Constitution of Japan denies the right of belligerence of states, in order to accomplish "international peace based on justice and order".

Others
Along with the US, the political stance of Peru during the Falklands War and that of the Netherlands during the 2003 invasion of Iraq was described by politicians as "political support, but no military support".

See also
Neutrality
Non-Aligned Movement
Neutral powers during World War II
Ireland in World War II

References

Law of war